The Kassel World War II bombings were a set of Allied strategic bombing attacks which took place from February 1942 to March 1945. In a single deadliest raid on 22–23 October 1943, 150,000 inhabitants were bombed-out, at least 6,000 people died, the vast majority of the city center was destroyed, and the fire of the most severe air raid burned for seven days. The US First Army captured Kassel on 3 April 1945, where only 50,000 inhabitants remained, versus 236,000 in 1939.

Targets

As well as being the capital of the provinces of Hesse-Nassau and Kurhessen, Kassel had some important targets:
Fieseler aircraft plant
Henschel & Sohn facilities, maker of the Tiger I and King Tiger heavy tanks
 The Henschel & Sohn firm's locomotive plant
 engine plant
 motor transport plant
 railway works
 Military HQs at Wehrkreis IX, and Bereich Hauptsitz Kassel
 Central Germany HQ, highway & railway construction
 Regional Supreme Court

Bombing raids

See also
 List of strategic bombing over Germany in World War II

References

Sources 
 Werner Dettmar: Die Zerstörung Kassels im Oktober 1943. Hesse, Fuldabrück 1983, 
 Gebhard Aders: Bombenkrieg/Strategien der Zerstörung. licoverlag 2004

External links
 RAF bombing of Kassel (October 1943)
 USAAF bombing of Kassel (September 1944)

20th century in Kassel
World War II strategic bombing of Germany
Firebombings
Germany–United Kingdom military relations
Germany–United States military relations
1940s in Hesse